Iceland first participated at the European Games at the inaugural 2015 Games but didn't win any medals. Iceland also fielded a team for 2019, but still not opening their medal count.

Medal tables

References